Jerónimo Navases (1787–?) was a Spanish painter, active in Valencia and mainly painting still life floral arrangements.

External links
 Valencia Art exhibit.

1787 births
People from Valencia
19th-century Spanish painters
19th-century Spanish male artists
Spanish male painters
Spanish floral still life painters
Year of death missing